Donald Eccles (26 April 1908 – 2 February 1986) was a British character actor.

Donald Yarrow Eccles was born in Nafferton, Yorkshire on 26 April 1908 the son of Charles Henry and Constance Eccles; his father was a doctor. Eccles was educated at Highgate School and then worked in an insurance office.

He made his stage debut in New York City in 1930, and later became known as a member of the Royal Shakespeare Company. His debut in London was in Counsellor at Law in 1934 at the Piccadilly. During the Second World War he spent six years in the Royal Navy.

In 1960 he acted in the film A Taste of Money and later appeared in many other films including A Midsummer Night's Dream (1968), The Wicker Man (1973), The Hunchback of Notre Dame (1982), Coming Out of the Ice (1982), The Dresser (1983), The Master of Ballantrae (1984), A Private Function (1984) and Young Sherlock Holmes (1985). He also appeared in many television roles, such as Pollio in I, Claudius and Mr Justice Vosper in the second series of Rumpole of the Bailey, until his death in a road accident in Brighton.

Filmography

References

External links

1908 births
1986 deaths
20th-century English male actors
English male film actors
English male stage actors
English male television actors
People educated at Highgate School
Road incident deaths in England